Salvatore Miceli (born 5 March 1974) is a retired Italian footballer.

In January 2003, he was exchanged with Sandro Cois.

References

External links

Italian footballers
Cosenza Calcio 1914 players
Venezia F.C. players
S.S.C. Napoli players
Piacenza Calcio 1919 players
U.C. Sampdoria players
Catania S.S.D. players
U.S. Catanzaro 1929 players
Ternana Calcio players
Serie A players
Association football midfielders
Sportspeople from the Province of Cosenza
1974 births
Living people
Footballers from Calabria